The College of Engineering, Guindy (CEG) is a public engineering college in Chennai, India and is Asia's oldest technical institution, founded in 1794. It is also the oldest technical institution to be established outside Europe.

History

Due to the growing need for surveyors by the East India Company, the 'School of Survey' was established in a building near Fort St. George on the suggestion of Michael Topping in 1794. This school was one of the first of its kind in the country and it started out with 8 students. It became the Civil Engineering School in 1858 and was renamed College of Engineering in 1859, with the inclusion of a mechanical engineering course. The college was shifted for a short period to Kalasa Mahal, Chepauk, before settling at its present location in 1920 as College of Engineering, Guindy.

College of Engineering, Guindy is one of the first institutes in India to offer degrees in mechanical engineering, electrical engineering, telecommunication, highway engineering and printing technology and materials science and engineering.

In 1978, College of Engineering, Guindy became a constituent college and the principal seat of Anna University.

Since 2019 the four flagship campuses of Anna University including the College of Engineering, Guindy were recommended to be recognized as an Institute of Eminence by the University Grants Commission of India. However, the Government of Tamil Nadu has rejected the Central Government's offer for fear of loss of the quota of reservations for candidates from backward caste (BC), most backward caste (MBC) backgrounds . The Vice-Chancellor of the university, M. K. Surappa, along with the alumni body of the institution were in favour of attaining the recognition as an Institute of Eminence.

Campus

Location 

Under Tamil Nadu State Government ownership, CEG covers around 223 acres of land right in the center of Chennai. It serves as the main campus of Anna University.

Hostels 

The college has 16 hostels which provide accommodation to over 3,500 students. Separate international hostels are available to cater the needs of international students and exchange students. Hostel messes are located in large centralized halls and serve nutritious meals. The hostels accommodate not only undergraduate students but also postgraduate students and there is a separate hostel for NRIs and foreign nationals.

Academics
College of Engineering, Guindy offers undergraduate Engineering degrees in various fields. It also offers postgraduate degrees such as MBA, MCA, M.E., M.Sc. M.Tech., M.S. by Research and Ph.D.programmes.

CEG has 16 Departments, 6 University Affiliated Centers, and 12 Research Centers where research programs are offered.

Student life

Students Services 
Many centers have been placed to address all the needs of students. These include the SC/ST cell, Center for Professional Development Education, Center for International Affairs, Health Centre, Center for Women Empowerment and the Student Affairs.

Institutional Programs 
Student wings of National Cadet Corps (NCC), National Service Scheme (NSS), National Sports Organisation (NSO) and Youth Red Cross (YRC) also function on campus and conduct various activities.

Clubs

Student-run societies:
 Arts Society 
 CEG Tech Forum
 Students Association
 Electronics and Communication Engineers' Association (ECEA)
 Information Science and Technology Association (ISTA)
 Society of Printing Engineers (SPE)
 Society of Civil Engineers (SCE)
 Society of Agricultural and Irrigation Engineers (SAIE) 
 Society of Electrical and Electronics Engineers (SEEE)
 Society of Mechanical Engineers (SME)
 Biomedical Engineers Association (BMEA)
 Association of Manufacturing Engineering (AME)
 Society of Geoinformatics Engineers (SGE)
 Computer Society of Anna University (CSAU)
 Society of Mining Engineers
 Society of Materials Science and Engineers (SMSE)
 Society of Industrial Engineers (SIE)

Student-run clubs:
 Rotaract Club of CEG (RCEG)
 Castle Red (The Official Chess Club of CEG).
 Aakriti (women empowerment)
 Capitalize (the entrepreneurship club)
 Saptham (Classical Music, Instruments and Dance Club of CEG)
 MCS (Math Computing Society)
 Green Brigade (Environment)
 Leo club of CEG
 Literary club
 Mathavam
 Pixels (Official photography & videography club)
 Quizzers Anonymous (Official quiz club)
 Robotics Club
 Innovative Hub of CEG (I-HUB) (Project works & participating in competitions)
 Siruthuligal (Charity)
 Team CEG Motorsports (An SAE collegiate club of CEG)
 CEG Spartanz (Official Variety Club)
 Sruthilaya (music)
 Students' Quality Council (SQC)
 Theatron (dramatics)
 The Guindy Times (campus magazine)
 Twisters (dance)

Sports Leagues organised by Students :
 Anna Kho-Kho Championship (AKKC)
 Anna Hockey League (AHL)
 Anna University Ball Badminton Federation

Events
 Kurukshetra is the first ever techno management college festival to attain UNESCO patronage. It has been certified with the ISO 9001:2015 and has acquired the support of the Ministry of Electronics and Information Technology, Digital India and the National e-Governance Division, Government of India in 2016. It conducts technical events, workshops, guest lectures, and displays projects to expand students' technical opportunities and knowledge.
Techofes: This is an inter-college cultural festival with an exciting array of events from debates to dance, innovative workshops on photography, DJing, etc. and pro shows.
 Sangarsh: Organized by the Rotaract club of CEG (RCEG), Sangarsh is a musical concert aimed at raising funds for needy sections of society.

Notable alumni
 A Lalitha, First women engineer of India
 A. C. Muthiah, Indian industrialist and Former President, Board of Control for Cricket in India
 Nagarjuna, Telugu Film Actor
 Anumolu Ramakrishna, Deputy Managing Director of Larsen & Toubro
 Crazy Mohan, Tamil comedy actor, script writer and playwright
Kavithalaya Krishnan  Indian film and television actor
 Dhiraj Rajaram, Founder & Chairman of Mu Sigma Inc
 Gopalaswami Parthasarathy, Former Indian High Commissioner to Pakistan, Australia and Myanmar and Chancellor, Central University of Jammu
 Kanuri Lakshmana Rao, Architect of India's water management, Former Union Minister of Irrigation & Power and recipient of the Padma Bhushan
 Krishnakumar Natarajan, Co-founder & Former Executive Chairman of Mindtree
 Krishnamachari Srikkanth, Former Indian Cricket Captain and Former Chairman, National Selection Committee of the Indian Cricket Team
 Kutraleeswaran, Long-distance swimmer and Guinness Book of World Records holder
 Madhan Karky, Tamil film lyricist
 Mendu Rammohan Rao, Former Dean Emeritus, Indian School of Business
 Munirathna Anandakrishnan, Former Chairman, Indian Institute of Technology, Kanpur and Former Vice-Chancellor, Anna University
 N. Mahalingam, Founder & Former Chairman, Sakthi Group and Former Chairman, Ethiraj College for Women
 P. S. Veeraraghavan, Director of Vikram Sarabhai Space Centre
 R. K. Baliga, the father of the Electronics City in Bangalore, India
 P. V. Nandhidhaa, Indian Chess player, India's 17th Woman Grandmaster. Refer List of Indian chess players.
Poondi Kumaraswamy-Ponnambalam Kumaraswamy, Engineer, Mathematician, and Hydrologist
 Raj Reddy, Turing Award winner, Professor at Carnegie-Mellon University and Padma Bhushan recipient 
 Rajkumar Bharathi, Classical singer and music composer
 Rangaswamy Narasimhan, cognitive scientist who developed TIFRAC, the first indigenous Indian computer, Padma Shri winner
 Ravi Ruia, Vice Chairperson & Co-founder of Essar Group
 S. Somasegar, Former Corporate Vice President, Developer Division, Microsoft
 Srinivasaraghavan Venkataraghavan, Former Indian Cricket Captain and Former Member, ICC Elite Umpires Panel
 Upendra J. Chivukula, Former Deputy Speaker, New Jersey General Assembly
 V. M. Muralidharan, Chairman, Ethiraj College for Women 
 V. S. Mahalingam, a distinguished DRDO scientist and Director of Centre for Artificial Intelligence and Robotics
 Venu Srinivasan, Chairman of Sundaram - Clayton Limited and TVS Motor Company
 Verghese Kurien, architect of Operation Flood and India's White Revolution and recipient of the Padma Vibhushan, Ramon Magsaysay Award and the World Food Prize

See also

 List of Tamil Nadu Government's Educational Institutions
 Heritage structures in Chennai
 Indian Institute of Technology, Madras
 National Institute of Technology, Tiruchirappalli

References

External links 

Official website

Engineering colleges in Chennai
Colleges affiliated to Anna University
1794 establishments in British India
Educational institutions established in 1794
Heritage sites in Chennai
Academic institutions formerly affiliated with the University of Madras
Academic institutions formerly affiliated with Anna University